The 1980 Richmond Spiders football team represented Richmond College during the 1980 NCAA Division I-A football season. The Spiders were led by first-year head coach Dal Shealy and played their home games at City Stadium. The Spiders finished with a 5–6 record.

Schedule

Roster

References

Richmond
Richmond Spiders football seasons
Richmond Spiders football